Beata or Beate is a female given name that occurs in several cultures and languages, including  Italian, German, Polish, and Swedish, and which is derived from the Latin beatus, meaning "blessed". Variants include Bea, Beade and Beáta. The name may refer to:

 
Beata Asimakopoulou (1932–2009), Greek actress
Beate Bille, (born 1976), Danish actress
Beata Brookes (1931–2015), British politician
Beata Bublewicz (born 1975), Polish politician
Beate Bühler (born 1964), German volleyball player 
Beata Gosiewska (born 1971), Polish politician
Beata Harju (born 1990), Finnish actress and filmmaker
Beate Heister (born 1951), German billionaire
Beata Kaczmarska (born 1970), Polish race walker
Beata Kitsikis (1907–1986), Greek politician
Beate Klarsfeld (born 1939), German Nazi hunter
Beata Kozidrak (born 1960), Polish singer
Beata Losman (born 1938), Swedish archivist
Beata Mikołajczyk (born 1985), Polish sprint canoer
Beata Obertyńska (1898–1980), Polish writer
Beata Papp (born 1985), Finnish figure skater
Beata Pozniak (born 1960), Polish actress
Beata Rosenhane (1638–1674), Swedish writer
Beate Sirota (1923–2012), American performing arts presenter
Beata Sokołowska-Kulesza (born 1974), Polish sprint canoer
Beata Sabina Straas (died 1773), Swedish actress
Beata Szydło (born 1963), Polish politician and prime minister
Beata Tyszkiewicz (born 1938), Polish actress
Beate Uhse-Rotermund (1919–2001), German pilot and entrepreneur
Beate Zschäpe (born 1975), German convicted neo-Nazi terrorist

References

See also
 Beat (male given name)
 Beatus (male given name)

Polish feminine given names
German feminine given names
Swedish feminine given names